Shah Rukn-e-Alam Colony is one of the autonomous towns of the city of Multan in the Punjab province of Pakistan. It was established in 1984 by Multan Development Authority.

Location 
Shah Rukn-e-Alam Colony was developed in Multan, and is connected to Masoom Shah Road and Bypass Road. It is a self-income scheme of Multan Development Authority. It was established in 1984.

Phases 

All the 8,490 residential plots have been disposed off. Development work including water supply, sewerage and roads has been completed.

References 

Populated places in Multan District